The Nicaraguan Cycling Federation (in Spanish: Federación Nicaragüense de Ciclismo) is the national governing body of cycle racing in Nicaragua.

It is a member of the UCI and COPACI.

References

Cycle racing organizations
Cycle racing in Nicaragua
Cycling